Izak van der Merwe (born 26 January 1984) is a retired South African tennis player.

Van der Merwe had a career high ATP singles ranking of 113 achieved on 1 August 2011.

Van der Merwe represented South Africa at the Davis Cup.

He says he tried to base his play on the former Wimbledon champion, Pete Sampras. 
>

Tennis career highlights

2005–2007: Career beginnings

Van der Merwe turned pro in 2005 and ended the year with a single ranking of 721. During this time Van der Merwe mainly played in the ITF Futures tour. In October 2005, Van der Merwe won his first ITF Futures single title in Zimbabwe F1.

In 2006 Van der Merwe reached 5 ITF Futures tour single finals, winning 1. In 2007 Van der Merwe won 3 ITF Futures tour titles.

2008: 1st Grand Slam entry

In June 2008, van der Merwe qualified into the 2008 Wimbledon main draw, beating World No. 177 Miguel Ángel López Jaén, World No. 126 Kristian Pless, and World No. 246 Frédéric Niemeyer. He would then go on to lose to Guillermo García-López 7–5, 6–2, 6–2.

In August 2008 Van der Merwe also reached his first Challenger tour final at the 	
Campos Do Jordao-1 in Brazil, where he lost to Brian Dabul.

2010: 1st ATP Challenger title

In August 2010 Van der Merwe won his maiden ATP Challenger title at the 	
Campos Do Jordao-1 in Brazil, when he defeated world number 88 Ricardo Mello.

2011: Second and Third ATP Challenger titles

In February Van der Merwe reached his first main draw Semi-Finals on the ATP World Tour, when he reached the Semi-Finals of the SA Tennis Open (ATP 250 Event) in Johannesburg, South Africa. He went on to lose to world number 110 Somdev Devvarman.

In April Van der Merwe won his second ATP Challenger title at the Soweto Open in Johannesburg, South Africa, when he defeated countryman and world number 184 Rik De Voest. In November Van der Merwe won his third ATP Challenger title at the 	
Charlottesville Charlottesville, Virginia, United States, when he defeated world number 283 Jesse Levine.

2012

In July he reached the Quarter-Finals of the Hall of Fame Tennis Championships (ATP 250 event) in Newport, RI, U.S.A. .

ATP Challenger and ITF Futures finals

Singles: 17 (8 titles-9 runner-ups)

Singles performance timeline

Current till 2013 US Open.

References

External links
 
 
 van der Merwe World Ranking History 

Tennis players from Johannesburg
South African male tennis players
1984 births
Living people
Old Dominion University alumni
White South African people